The Unchurched Belt is a region in the far Northwestern United States that has low rates of religious participation.  The term derives from Bible Belt and the notion of the unchurched.

The term was first applied to the West Coast of the United States in 1985 by Rodney Stark and William Sims Bainbridge, who found that California, Oregon, and Washington had the United States' lowest church membership rates in 1971, and that there was little change in this pattern between 1971 and 1980. Since 1980, however, California's church membership rate has increased; in 2000, the state had a higher percentage of church members than several states in the Northeast and Midwest. Some religious groups are undercounted in surveys of religious membership.

, the six states and provinces reported to have the lowest rate of religious adherence in North America were Oregon, Washington, Alaska, Nevada, and West Virginia. Although West Virginia is reported to have a low rate of religious adherence, it is above the national average rate of church attendance. Sociologist Samuel S. Hill, comparing data from the North American Religion Atlas and the American Religious Identity Survey, concluded that a "disproportionately large number of West Virginians" were not counted. In 2006, Gallup reported that the lowest rates of church attendance among the 48 contiguous states were in Nevada and the New England states of Connecticut, New Hampshire, Vermont, Rhode Island, Massachusetts, and Maine. Church attendance in the western states of Oregon, Washington, and California was only slightly higher. A 2008 Gallup poll comparing belief in God among U.S. regions found that only 59% of residents in the Western United States believe in God, compared to 80% in the East, 83% in the Midwest, and 86% in the South.

A 2011 Gallup poll showed that when it comes to the number of people seeing religion as important in everyday life, New Hampshire and Vermont were the least religious, both with 23%, followed up with 25% in Maine.

There has been debate as to whether the Western United States is still the most irreligious part of the United States, due to New England surpassing it as the region with the highest percentage of residents unaffiliated with any religion. On a state level, it is not clear whether the least religious state resides in New England or the Western United States, as the 2008 American Religious Identification Survey (ARIS) ranked Vermont as the state with the highest percentage of residents claiming no religion at 34%, but a 2009 Gallup poll ranked Oregon as the state with the highest percentage of residents identifying with "No religion, Atheist, or Agnostic", at 24.6%.

See also
 Irreligion in the United States
 Religion in the United States
 Bible Belt
 Banana Belt
 List of belt regions of the United States

References

External links
 2015 Maps of Religious States of America
 Map Gallery of Religion in the United States

Religion in the Pacific Northwest
Religion in the United States
Northeastern United States
Religion in New England
Belt regions of the United States
Irreligion in the United States
History of religion in the United States